Herby (also Romanized as Herby) is a village in Meydan Chay Rural District, in the Central District of Tabriz County, East Azerbaijan Province, Iran. At the 2006 census, its population was 2,399, in 640 families.

Its fame is due to its pleasurable climate & amazing nature. Herbi is also known for its damask rose.

References 

Populated places in Tabriz County